Michael Short (born August 1975) is Professor of Control Engineering and Systems Informatics and leads the Centre for Sustainable Engineering at Teesside University in the UK. He received a BEng (Electrical and Electronic Engineering) in 1999 and a PhD (Robotics) in 2003 from the University of Sunderland. In 2012 he was also awarded a PGCHE from Teesside University. He was previously at the University of Leicester until 2009, and was made Reader (Professor) in January 2015 and full (Chair) Professor (by Research) in August 2020. Michael is also a time-served automation and process control engineer, with eight years' industrial experience. 

Michael is a full member of the Institute of Engineering and Technology (MIET) since 1999, a fellow of the Higher Education Academy (FHEA) since 2012 and a full member of the Institute of Electrical and Electronics Engineers (MIEEE), and he also sits on the IEEE Industrial Electronics Society Technical Committee on Factory Automation (TCFA) since 2012. As of November 2022, he has authored or co-authored over 170 reviewed publications and won six awards including the IEEE James C. Hung Award for best paper in Factory Automation in 2011. As of November 2022 he has a H-index of 23 and an i-10 index of 43. Since 2003 he has been Principal or Co-Investigator on multiple completed and ongoing funded research and innovation projects. He is associate section editor for the Energies International Journal and associate editor for the Frontiers in Energy Efficiency Technologies International Journal. He has made scholarly contributions in several areas, including probability and statistics, real-time systems and scheduling, embedded systems and control, robotics and smart grid. 

Michael has appeared in most forms of media to discuss the impacts of his work, including public webcasts, invited/keynote speeches, plenary lectures, and radio broadcasts, magazine features/interviews  and print/online news. He has contributed to several UK Science and Technology Committee (House of Lords) inquiries, and has led authorship of a commissioned report on digital trade for the UK Government. In Summer 2020 was interviewed on BBC Radio and featured in news articles regarding his role in the international response to manufacture PPE and Ventilators during the 2020/2021 waves of the COVID-19 viral pandemic. In November 2022 he was featured on BBC Television and in news articles after being listed as one of the ten most influential people in the UK working within the Net Zero agenda.

References

External links 

 

 
 
 

1975 births
Living people
English electrical engineers
Academics of Teesside University
Alumni of the University of Sunderland